is a public park in the Yokoami district of Sumida, Tokyo, Japan.

History
Following the Great Kantō earthquake on 1 September 1923, as many as 44,000 people were killed in the park when it was swept by a firestorm. Following this disaster the park became the location of the main memorial to the earthquake; the Earthquake Memorial Hall and a nearby charnel house containing the ashes of 58,000 victims of the earthquake.

Following World War II, the park also became the location of the main memorial to the victims of the Bombing of Tokyo in 1944 and 1945. The ashes of 105,400 people killed in the raids were interred in Yokoamichō Park between 1948 and 1951. A memorial to the people killed in the raids was opened in the park in March 2001.

Notes

References

External links
  
  – Park Guide (in English)

Parks and gardens in Tokyo
Sumida, Tokyo
1930 establishments in Japan